Red Dragons Pniewy - Polish futsal club from Pniewy. Team plays in 1st Polish Futsal League.

Players 
 Jakub Kaczmarek - rozgrywający
 Bartosz Burzyński - skrzydłowy
 Damian Gaj - pivot
 Łukasz Frajtag - coach-skrzydłowy/rozgrywający
 Marek Bober - bramkarz
 Kuba Szukała - pivot
 Patryk Zdankiewicz - skrzydłowy 
 Michał Roj - captain-pivot
 Dawid Kliszewski - skrzydłowy
 Michał Ozorkiewicz - pivot
 Szymon Piasek - skrzydłowy/rozgrywający
 Adam Wachoński - skrzydłowy/rozgrywający
 Bartosz Olech - skrzydłowy 
 Patryk Hoły - skrzydłowy
 Filip Klar - bramkarz
 Rafał Roj - bramkarz
 Szymon Skrzypczak - skrzydłowy

External links
Official webpage

Futsal clubs in Poland
Szamotuły County
Sport in Greater Poland Voivodeship
Futsal clubs established in 2005
2005 establishments in Poland